In computing, Flow is middleware software which allows data-integration specialists to connect disparate systems (whether  on-premises, hosted or  in the cloud); transforming and restructuring data as required between environments. Flow functionality can be utilised for data integration projects, for EDI and for  data-conversion activities. Developed by Flow Software Ltd in New Zealand, Flow is available through a variety of partner companies or directly from Flow Software in New Zealand and Australia.

Integration software allows organisations to continue using existing applications, overcoming the need to customize or upgrade as their requirements change. By using integration software, many businesses benefit from reduced dependence on manual keying of data and the avoidance of costs and delays caused by keying errors.

Features
Flow enables data management:
 Transformation of data, within and between sets
 Generation and consumption of data, accessioning from specified sets within structures
 Transportation of data files, using various transport formats, including secure
 Specification of task work-flows
 Notification of transactions and formats via reports

Data Generation
Flow accesses and generates data in structured formats, from files or databases.

Flow can access and read from, or write to databases using either the SQL89 or SQL92 specification. Informix provides support for extended SQL use.
 Microsoft SQL Server 2000 & above
 Microsoft Access 97 97 above
 MySQL 4.x
 Oracle 8i
 InterBase 5.6
 Informix
 IBM DB2
 MYOB
 Any ODBC compliant database as per  the Microsoft ODBC specification
 Any ADO compliant data source as per the Microsoft ADO specification

Flow can access and read from, or write to various file types.
 Any ASCII format file
 Any EDI type file based on either UN/EDIFACT or  ANSI X12 standards
 Any XML file based on XML standards such as SOAP, XHTML or ebXML

Data Transformation
A visual mapping engine is used to configure data transformation between data sets. Data can be restructured as it is transformed, thus allowing for dissimilar data structures between source and destination. Flow data access operates independently of the mapping layer. The applied mapping logic uses events containing Object Pascal code.

Data Transportation
Flow transports generated data and files using the following formats:
 Local file access
 LAN
 FTP
 HTTP/S POST
 HTTP/S GET
 SMTP
 POP
 ebMS
 SOAP

User Interface
The Flow user interface allows users to create and processes, activate processes and view activity logs.

Email notifications of Flow process activity can also be configured.

Actions
Flow uses predefined processing of events that can be executed either on schedule, or event driven. Actions and their results are logged and available via the user interface.

Actions include:
 Transformation of data or files
 Generation of specific reports
 Windows-based shell commands
 Outward-bound transports of data or files
 Selected SQL statements
 Custom plugin actions

Reports
Flow includes a report writer based on the software Report Builder. The report writer can create custom notification reports providing users with details related to their transactions. Reports can be created in XML, PDF, JPEG and XLS. Reports can be embedded into email messages if required.

References

External links
 Flow Software ComputerWorld article
 EDI Basics

See also
 Data mapping
 Data integration
 Knowledge management

Data management software
Knowledge management
Middleware